The Dean of Emly was based at The Cathedral Church of St Alibeus, Emly in the former Diocese of Emly within the Church of Ireland. St Alibeus' cathedral was demolished in 1877.

List of deans of Emly
1245–1251 Gilbert O'Doherty (Gilbertus)(afterwards Bishop of Emly, 1251) 
1272 Maurice 
1295 Philip 
1305 William Roughead 
1418 John Pellyn 
1502 Raymond de Burgh 
1542 Donogh Ryan 
1602 Hugh Hogan 
1608 Kennedy M'Brian 
1615 John Darling 
1621–1626 Edward Warren (afterwards Dean of Ossory, 1626)
1627 John Crayford 
1640 William Burleigh 
1666 Tempest Illingworth 
1669 George Mundy 
1675–1685 Robert Ewing 
1685–1692 Ulysses Burgh (afterwards Bishop of Ardagh, 1692) 
1693–1695 Thomas Smyth (afterwards Bishop of Limerick, Ardfert and Aghadoe, 1695) 
1697–1700 Richard Reader (afterwards Dean of Kilmore, 1700) 
1700/1–1709 Enoch Reader
1710–1713 John Wetherby (afterwards Dean of Cashel, 1713)  
1714–1735 William Perceval 
1735–1736 James Auchmuty (afterwards Dean of Armagh, 1736) 
1736–1765 John Brandreth
1765–1766 John Averell (afterwards Dean of Limerick, 1766) 
1766–1775 James Hawkins (afterwards Bishop of Dromore, 1775 
1775–1776 William Evelyn
1776–1818 Richard Moore
1818–1826 Henry Vesey-Fitzgerald (afterwards Dean of Kilmore, 1826) 
1826–1845 Thomas Philip Le Fanu
1845–1851 Brabazon William Disney (afterwards Dean of Armagh, 1851) 
1852–1864 Denis Browne
1864–1867 William Alexander (afterwards Bishop of Derry and Raphoe, 1867)
1867-1870 Vacant pending disestablishment

References

 
Emly
Diocese of Limerick and Killaloe